This is a list of men's Twenty20 International cricket grounds. One hundred and seventy-eight cricket grounds have been used since the first cricket Twenty20 International (T20I) match in February 2005. The grounds are listed in the order in which they were first used as a venue for a T20I match.

The Albert Park Ground 2 in Suva, Fiji became the 178th T20I venue when it hosted the semi-finals of the 2023 Pacific Island Cricket Challenge in March 2023.

List of Twenty20 International grounds
As of 18 March 2023 (T20I 2029):

Grounds by country
List of grounds by country, as of 18 March 2023 (T20I 2029)

See also
 List of Test cricket grounds
 List of One Day International cricket grounds
 List of women's Twenty20 International cricket grounds
 List of cricket grounds by capacity

References

External links 
 Cricinfo – Grounds

Twenty20
Grounds
Twenty20 International cricket